The 2018 CS Tallinn Trophy was held from November 26–December 2, 2018 in Tallinn, Estonia. It is part of the 2018–19 ISU Challenger Series. Medals were awarded in the disciplines of men's singles, ladies' singles, pair skating, and ice dancing.

Entries 
The International Skating Union published the list of entries on October 30, 2018.

Changes to preliminary assignments

Results

Men

Ladies

Pairs

Ice dancing

References

External links
 
 2018 CS Tallinn Trophy at the International Skating Union

Tallinn Trophy
CS Tallinn Trophy
2018 in Estonian sport